"Bart of Darkness" is the first episode of the sixth season of the American animated television series The Simpsons. It originally aired on the Fox network in the United States on September 4, 1994. In the episode, Bart breaks his leg and becomes increasingly isolated in his room. He starts spying on neighbors with a telescope and begins to suspect that Ned Flanders has murdered his wife. The episode was produced during the 1994 Northridge earthquake, which delayed production by a month, and is largely a parody of the Alfred Hitchcock film Rear Window.

The episode was written by Dan McGrath, and directed by Jim Reardon.

Plot
Bart and Lisa are desperately trying to cool down while Springfield is in the midst of a heatwave, when Otto Mann suddenly arrives in their street driving a semi-trailer truck with a swimming pool on the back. After the children of the neighborhood spend some brief time enjoying the pool, Otto declares that their time is up and admits to Bart that his employers don't have the budget to operate the truck for more than one day. Disappointed, Bart and Lisa persuade Homer to buy a swimming pool for their house, but when word spreads that the Simpsons have built their own pool, a massive crowd of children from Springfield Elementary School show up at their house and a pool party quickly ensues. During this party, Bart gets dared to attempt an ambitious dive into the pool from the family tree house, but Nelson Muntz distracts Bart to the point where he falls to the ground and breaks his left leg.

After a hospital visit, Bart is ordered to spend the rest of the summer wearing a full cast over his broken leg, leaving him unable to swim in the pool or socialize with any of the other children. He soon retreats to his bedroom, where he begins spying on nearby houses using a telescope that he borrowed from Lisa. That night, Bart becomes gradually more concerned about his next door neighbor Ned Flanders after he first hears a womanly scream from the Flanders house and later witnesses Ned digging a grave in the backyard, expressing remorse that he's become a "murderer". The next day, Bart overhears Ned telling his sons Rod and Todd that their mother is "with God" and they will soon join her. All of this leads Bart to believe that Ned has secretly murdered his wife Maude and is now planning to do the same to their children.

Meanwhile, Lisa revels in her newfound popularity with the schoolkids as a direct result of the swimming pool. Homer and Marge also find some time to enjoy the pool by themselves, although Homer's botched attempt to chlorinate the pool water causes problems for the schoolkids when they come back the next day. Lisa's time as the popular kid also proves to be short-lived when the other children abandon her in favor of Martin Prince, whose family now has an even bigger backyard pool than the Simpsons.

Without the attention from the other kids, Lisa soon notices Bart's fears of what Ned might be up to, and she reluctantly agrees to help him investigate by sneaking into the Flanders house while Ned is away. The plan goes awry, however, when Ned unexpectedly comes home early and enters the house with an axe in his hands. Bart, afraid of what he thinks will happen to Lisa if Ned catches her, leaps out of his chair and struggles to chase after Ned in spite of his broken leg. He follows Ned into the attic, where Lisa has hidden herself, and they both start screaming in terror, only to watch as Ned puts the axe away for safekeeping. Ned confusedly asks Bart and Lisa what's going on, and when Bart accuses him of killing Maude, he faints from the shock.

After the police arrive to question Ned, they discover that Maude is alive and well, having just returned from her time "with God" at a Bible camp in the countryside. Bart presses Ned about the grave he dug in the backyard, forcing Ned to tearfully confess that the grave was for Maude's favorite ficus benjamina, which he had accidentally overwatered. When Ned sees the police have unearthed the dead plant from his backyard, he lets out a high-pitched scream which sounds like a woman's voice, and Bart recognizes this as the scream he originally heard. All of Bart's lingering questions are now answered, and Ned is cleared of any criminal suspicion.

Martin's joy at being the new popular kid gets the better of him when he overestimates the capacity of the new pool, which quickly breaks apart from the physical stress. Nelson rips off Martin's swim trunks as a final insult, and the schoolkids all walk away in anger. Martin, standing naked and alone amid the wreckage, solemnly begins to sing "Summer Wind" as he watches the sunset.

Production
For season six, Fox moved The Simpsons back to its original Sunday night time of 8 pm, having aired on Thursdays for the previous four seasons. It has remained in this slot ever since.

Dan McGrath was chosen to write the episode, while Jim Reardon directed. The episode was originally produced as the season finale of the fifth season, but was held over and aired as the premiere of the sixth. This was because, along with "Lisa's Rival", the episode was in production at the time of the 1994 Northridge earthquake. The earthquake damaged much of the Film Roman building in which The Simpsons writing and animation staff worked, forcing them to move out for three months and continue production in a temporary building. The only staff members that came in expecting to work were future show runners Bill Oakley and Josh Weinstein. As a result, the staff was given a month more than they would usually have had to work on the episode, which Reardon described as "greatly benefiting" it. Having been a director on the series for five years before this episode, he believed that this "was closer to what [he] was trying to achieve as a director than [he] had done before". He credited this to the extra time, and used it to insert little details, such as having Bart get stuck on the fabric of the chair he was in, and wearing his underwear instead of a swimsuit.

Many of the heat wave jokes at the start of the episode were based on past events of the crew's lives. The sitting in front of the fridge-freezer joke, came from McGrath, who had done a similar thing as a child. The Springfield Pool-Mobile was based on a similar vehicle from David Mirkin's childhood, where a truck with a "spinning cars" fairground ride on the back would often come around his neighborhood. Flanders' feminine scream was performed by Tress MacNeille and not his regular voice actor Harry Shearer. Krusty's mispronunciation of Ravi Shankar's name was an ad-lib, that Mirkin kept in after the editing process because he liked it so much.

Cultural references
 The episode title is a reference to Joseph Conrad's 1899 novella Heart of Darkness.
 Springfield's wax museum features models of The Beatles and the original cast of M*A*S*H, and Bart plays Stratego on his own.
 The barn building scene with the onlooking Amish man is a reference to Peter Weir's 1985 film Witness.
 The pool dance scene sees Lisa in a role like those of Esther Williams, while Bart's play has similar elements of the works of Anton Chekhov.
 The Itchy & Scratchy episode title references The Planet of the Apes, with the mutants being referencing the Star Trek episode "The Menagerie".
 The first Klassic Krusty episode is dated February 6, 1961. Krusty's guest was AFL–CIO chairman George Meany.
 The third act is largely a pastiche of Alfred Hitchcock's Rear Window. As in the film, a crippled Bart witnesses an apparent murder through his telescope, with the original musical cues also being used. James Stewart's character, L. B. "Jeff" Jefferies, appears twice, caricatured as his initial film appearance. The pictures on the wall of Jeff's room are the same as in Rear Window. 
 At the end of the episode, Martin begins to sing Frank Sinatra's "Summer Wind"; the song then continues instrumentally over the closing credits, instead of the show's usual theme music.

Reception

Critical reception
Mike Duffy praised the episode, stating it showed that The Simpsons was "just as strong and funny as it ever was".

Elaine Liner of the Corpus Christi Caller-Times praised the writing as "crisp, hilarious and multi-layered", praising its many cultural references and noting the "biting commentary" of Maude Flanders' line, "I was at Bible camp learning to be more judgmental". Later reviews shared these sentiments.

Warren Martyn and Adrian Wood, authors of the book I Can't Believe It's a Bigger and Better Updated Unofficial Simpsons Guide, found that the "eventual explanation for [Flanders'] murderous behavior is hilarious".

Tim Knight called it "a terrific opener to the season".

Ratings
In this original American broadcast, "Bart of Darkness" finished 44th in the ratings for the week of August 29 to September 4, 1994, with a Nielsen rating of 8.9 and an audience share of 17. The episode was the third highest rated show on the Fox network that week.

References

External links

 
 

The Simpsons (season 6) episodes
1994 American television episodes
Parodies of films
Parody television episodes